Dr. Ahmad Mahmoud Karima, professor of Islamic law and comparative jurisprudence at Al-Azhar University, is best known for his religious moderation and condemnations of radicalism, and for his intense criticism of the Salafi-Wahhabi movement, and the Muslim Brotherhood group.

He declared after the 2016 international conference on Sunni Islam in Grozny that "If the world is looking forward to uprooting terrorism, it has to stand up against Wahhabism because they are the root of all sedition and conflict."

Books 
Among his well-known writings are:
 Al-Salafiyya bayna al-Aseel wa al-Dakheel.
 Gama'at al-Ikhwan.

See also 
 Ahmad al-Tayyeb
 Ali Gomaa
 Ali al-Jifri
 List of Ash'aris and Maturidis
 2016 international conference on Sunni Islam in Grozny

References 

1951 births
Living people
People from Giza Governorate
Asharis
Muslim reformers
19th-century Muslim theologians
Critics of Wahhabism
Sunni Muslim scholars of Islam
Sunni imams
Egyptian imams
Egyptian Sunni Muslims
Egyptian Maliki scholars
Al-Azhar University alumni
Academic staff of Al-Azhar University